Johnny McGrattan (born 13 January 1977) is a former hurler from Northern Ireland, who played as a forward for the Down senior team.  

Stevenson joined the panel during the Oireachtas Tournament in 1996 and was a regular member of the starting fifteen until he was dropped before the 2006 championship. During that time he won one National League (Division 2) medal and one Ulster medal.

At club level McGrattan is a two-time Ulster medalist with Ballygalget. In addition to this he has also won nine county club championship medals.

References

1977 births
Living people
Ballygalget hurlers
Down inter-county hurlers
People from County Down
Ulster inter-provincial hurlers